La Londe is a commune in the Seine-Maritime department in the Normandy region in northern France. It was first mentioned in historical records in 1170.

Geography
The commune borders the department of the Eure.

Population

Toponymy 
Lunda around 1170. There are more than 100 place-names la Londe in Normandy. It means "the wood, the grove". It derives from Old Norse lundr "grove".

Places of interest
 
 A memorial to the Canadian soldiers that liberated the town in August 1944.
 The church of Notre-Dame, dating from the sixteenth century.
 A seventeenth-century château.
 A stone cross from the sixteenth century.
 Some Roman ruins.

See also
Communes of the Seine-Maritime department

References

External links

Official commune website 

Communes of Seine-Maritime
1170 establishments in Europe
1170s establishments in France